MCR Hotels is an American hotel owner-operator. It is the fourth largest hotel owner in the United States by room count.

In 2021, MCR purchased the Lexington Hotel in New York City.

References

External links
 Official website

Hotel chains in the United States
Hospitality companies of the United States